Serhiy Ferenchak; Sergey Ferenchak (27 April 1984 – 19 May 2021) was a Ukrainian (until 2014) and Russian football midfielder.

References

External links 
 Stats on SKChF Sevastopol club's Site 
 
 
 

1984 births
2021 deaths
People from Krasnoperekopsk Raion
Ukrainian footballers
Naturalised citizens of Russia
Russian footballers
Association football midfielders
Ukrainian footballers banned from domestic competitions
Ukrainian Premier League players
FC Sevastopol players
SC Tavriya Simferopol players
FC Khimik Krasnoperekopsk players
FC Tytan Armyansk players
FC Zorya Luhansk players
FC Belshina Bobruisk players
Crimean Premier League players
FC Sevastopol (Russia) players
FC Rubin Yalta players
Ukrainian expatriate footballers
Ukrainian expatriate sportspeople in Belarus
Expatriate footballers in Belarus